Liepana is a genus of tephritid  or fruit flies in the family Tephritidae.

Species
Liepana apiciclara (Hardy & Drew, 1996)
Liepana latifrons Hardy & Drew, 1996
Liepana lugubris (Macquart, 1847)
Liepana helichrysii Hardy & Drew, 1996

References

Tephritinae
Tephritidae genera
Diptera of Australasia